Rayno Gerber (born 28 January 1981 in Port Elizabeth) is a South African rugby union footballer.

He joined the  prior to the 2013 Currie Cup Premier Division.

References

External links

itsrugby.co.uk profile

Living people
1981 births
South African rugby union players
Rugby union props
Free State Cheetahs players
Bulls (rugby union) players
Blue Bulls players
Afrikaner people
Rugby union players from Port Elizabeth
South African expatriate rugby union players
Expatriate rugby union players in France
Expatriate rugby union players in England
South African expatriate sportspeople in France
South African expatriate sportspeople in England